Koninklijke Hockey Club Dragons, also known as KHC Dragons or simply Dragons, is a Belgian field hockey club based in Brasschaat, Antwerp Province. The club was founded in 1946. Since the end of the eighties the club competes in Belgium's first tier, Honour Division.

History 
HC Dragons were founded on the 26th of October 1946 at Café Royal in Berchem. With only 11 members the club played recreational hockey in the Belgian lower divisions.

Before moving in 1961 to the present location in Brasschaat the club played on different fields around Antwerp. The club's turning point came in 1981 when Jacques Daems became the president of the club. It was his ambition that the club should be one of the best in Belgium. A few years later the club installed its first artificial turf and promoted in 1988 to the Honour Division. A year later the women's team promoted to the Honour Division as well.

In 1996 the club celebrated its 50th anniversary and changed its name to Koninklijke Hockey Club Dragons (Royal Hockey Club Dragons). Meanwhile, the club installed its second artificial turf and the club won its first silverware when the women's team won in 1994 the Belgian double.

Ather the first successes with the women's team, the men's team won its first championship in 1997. Ever since both Dragons men and women are considered Belgian top teams.

Together with the rise of Belgian hockey, Dragons flourished as well at the European level. After winning its 6th national title in 2010 Dragons participated for the first time in the Euro Hockey League. Beating the reigning UHC Hamburg. One year later Dragons won the Bronze medal and played the EHL final 2013.

Besides the successes, the club kept growing in numbers and added a third artificial turf in 2013. In 2015 Dragons was the host of the World League Semi-Final and added even a fourth field. At the moment KHC Dragons count 1500 members and are the biggest hockey club in Belgium.

Pronunciation
In English communication, the club is often pronounced in an English manner. Officially though, the club has to be pronounced in the French way (drʁagõ) without 's'.

Therefore, the Dragons (De Draken) is a nickname for the players. (sometimes female players are referred to as Dragonettes).

Players

Current squad

Men's squad

Head coach:  Dennis Dijkshoorn

Women's squad

Head coach: Justus Robert

Notable players

Men's internationals

Women's internationals

 Louise Cavenaile
 Stephanie De Groof
 
 Emily Beatty
 Kate Lloyd
 Shirley McCay
 
 Chiara Tiddi

Honours

Men
Belgian Hockey League
Winners (12): 1996–97, 1998–99, 1999–2000, 2000–01, 2002–03, 2009–10, 2010–11, 2014–15, 2015–16, 2016–17, 2017–18, 2020–21
Euro Hockey League
Runners-up (1): 2012–13
EuroHockey Club Trophy
Winners (1): 2001
Runners-up (1): 1998
EuroHockey Cup Winners Trophy
Winners (2): 2003, 2005
Belgian Cup
Winners (3): 1993, 2002, 2005
Belgian Indoor Championship
Winners (1): 1999

Women
Belgian Hockey League
 Winners (1): 1993–94
EuroHockey Club Trophy
 Winners (1): 2022
Belgian Cup
 Winners (2): 1994, 2005
Belgian Indoor Championship
 Winners (1): 1997

References

 
Belgian field hockey clubs
1946 establishments in Belgium
Field hockey clubs established in 1946
Sport in Antwerp Province
Brasschaat